Karl Martitsch (19 November 1917 – 20 August 2000) was an Austrian cross-country skier. He competed in the men's 18 kilometre event at the 1948 Winter Olympics.

References

External links
 

1917 births
2000 deaths
Austrian male cross-country skiers
Austrian male Nordic combined skiers
Olympic cross-country skiers of Austria
Olympic Nordic combined skiers of Austria
Cross-country skiers at the 1948 Winter Olympics
Nordic combined skiers at the 1948 Winter Olympics
People from Villach-Land
Sportspeople from Carinthia (state)
20th-century Austrian people